Jon Daniel Runyan Jr. (born August 8, 1997) is an American football guard for the Green Bay Packers of the National Football League (NFL). He played college football at Michigan.

College career
Runyan played offensive tackle at Michigan. He was named first-team All-Big Ten as a junior and senior.

Professional career

Runyan was selected by the Green Bay Packers in the sixth round, with the 192nd overall pick of the 2020 NFL Draft. He was signed on June 5, 2020.

Runyan saw his first NFL action on September 13, 2020, during a Week 1 victory over the Minnesota Vikings, filling in at right guard after starter Lane Taylor and primary backup Lucas Patrick suffered injuries.

Personal life
A native of Moorestown, New Jersey, Runyan is the son of former NFL player and U.S. Congressman Jon Runyan. During college, he took time to study in Spain.

References

External links
Green Bay Packers bio
Michigan Wolverines bio

1997 births
Living people
Green Bay Packers players
American football offensive guards
Michigan Wolverines football players
Players of American football from New Jersey
People from Moorestown, New Jersey
Sportspeople from Burlington County, New Jersey